The International School of Louisiana (ISL) is a system of charter schools in Greater New Orleans. Three campuses are located in New Orleans. The K-8 school offers a French immersion program and a Spanish immersion program.  it was one of two New Orleans schools chartered by the State of Louisiana that is not a part of the Recovery School District (RSD). The International School of Louisiana (ISL) educates students in K-8 across three campuses located in Dixon (K-2nd), Uptown (3-8th), and the Westbank (K-5th). Our commitment to diversity is evident in both our teacher and student populations. ISL employs over 200 staff members from 33 countries and fluent in 23 different languages who work together to educate approximately 1200 students (43% African American, 29% White, 25% Latinx/Hispanic, 2% Asian/Pacific and 1% American Indian).

History
The school was founded in 2000 by Julie Fabian, Maria Redmann Treffinger, Jane Fitzpatrick, Shelley Stephenson Midura, and Ivan Baas-Thomas. The original location was at the First United Methodist Church in Mid-City, but the school relocated to Camp Street after hurricane Katrina.

In 2011 ISL had received more applications for the French immersion program than it had in any previous year. That year, its Algiers campus opened. It was the first language immersion school on the West Bank side.

In 2012 the Jefferson Parish campus opened. When it opened it had 328 students, a smaller number than originally anticipated. The Jefferson Campus closed in 2014.

The school restructured in 2017, opening the Dixon Campus at 4040 Eagle St. Serving students from Kindergarten-2nd, re-organizing the Uptown campus to serve 3rd-8th at 1400 Camp St., and serving Kindergarten-5th at the Westbank campus.

Currently, ISL serves 1183 students across 3 campuses in New Orleans (Dixon Campus, Uptown Campus, and Westbank Campus).

Locations
The Dixon Campus is located at the former Mary Bethune Building in the Dixon Neighborhood. The Uptown Street Campus is located in the former Andrew Jackson Elementary School in the Lower Garden District  The Olivier Street campus is located in Algiers Point.

Academics
In 2014, according to the state rankings, the school system received an "A" grade. The Center for Education Reform in 2007 ranked the International School as one of the best charter schools in the United States. ISL is the only Louisiana school to be named a “Charter School of the Year” by the Center for Education Reform, the nation’s leading education advocacy organization. We work diligently to further our mission to provide a challenging education emphasizing language immersion, international awareness, the celebration of diversity, and community responsibility. As a non-selective school, ISL enrolls a minimum of 53% of students identified as at-risk. The critical work that inspires us each day has earned our school, teachers, and students recognition, nationally and locally.

ISL is among the first Louisiana State Certified Immersion Schools, is one of only two Spanish language immersion schools in the metro area, notably won the COSEBOC Excellence in Education award for the effective elimination of the achievement gap for boys of color, and is the proud honoree of the 2015 Public Education Award for Exemplary Language Immersion Education, among other recognitions and awards.

ISL does not discriminate against students on the basis of race, color, national origin, gender, disability, family situation, intellectual or athletic ability, sexual orientation, gender identity or expression, or any other basis that would be illegal if used by a district board of education. ISL complies with all applicable Louisiana statutes concerning public schools.

References

External links

 International School of Louisiana

Education in New Orleans
Elementary schools in Louisiana
Middle schools in Louisiana
Educational institutions established in 2000
2000 establishments in Louisiana